Labour Party leadership elections were held in the following countries in 2013:

2013 Israeli Labor Party leadership election
2013 New Zealand Labour Party leadership election